Bust-a-Move Universe, known in Japan as , and in the PAL region as Puzzle Bobble Universe, is a puzzle video game developed by Taito and Arika and published by Square Enix for the Nintendo 3DS. It was released in Japan as a launch title on February 26, 2011, and was released in North America on March 27.

Gameplay

Bust-a-Move Universe is similar to its predecessors in that the goal is to connect three bubbles of the same color to make them disappear. Different modes of play include boss battles, 100-second, 300-second, or Challenge Mode. Bubble dragon duo Bub and Bob travel the universe in a spaceship as doors open on planets, which release bubbles that turn into space debris. Bub must save Bob from being captured.

Development
First shown at Nintendo World 2011, it was later revealed to be a Japanese launch title.

Reception

The game received "generally unfavorable reviews" according to the review aggregation website Metacritic. Nintendo Life said that the game was "a disappointingly thin package as it offers virtually nothing new to the series or long-time fans." In Japan, Famitsu gave it a score of all four sixes for a total of 24 out of 40.

Notes

References

External links

Bust-a-Move Universe (YouTube)

2011 video games
Arika games
Bubble Bobble
Multiplayer and single-player video games
Nintendo 3DS games
Nintendo 3DS-only games
Puzzle video games
Square Enix games
Taito games
Video games developed in Japan